This is a list of notable Roman Catholic priests, both living and dead, who are citizens or permanent residents of Pakistan.

List of Pakistani priests

A 
Rufin Anthony †

B

C 
Joseph Cordeiro †
Joseph Coutts

D 
Jimmy deSouza †
 Theophilus D'Souza †

F 
Andrew Francis †

I 
George Ibrahim †

J 
Edward Joseph 
John Joseph †

L 
Anthony Theodore Lobo †

M 
 Emmanuel Yousaf Mani
 Iftikhar Moon

P 
 Inayat Patras 
Bonaventure Patrick Paul OFM †
Joseph Paul
Simeon Anthony Pereira †
Evarist Pinto

R 
 Khalid Rashid 
 Indrias Rehmat
Max John Rodrigues

S 
Lawrence Saldanha
Sebastian Francis Shah OFM
Younan Shahzad

T 
Benny Travas
Armando Trindade †

V 
 P A Varkey †

Y 
Patras Yusaf †

References

 
Lists of Roman Catholics
Catholic priests